Maria Rus (born 19 January 1983) is a Romanian sprinter. She competed in the women's 4 × 400 metres relay at the 2004 Summer Olympics.

References

1983 births
Living people
Athletes (track and field) at the 2004 Summer Olympics
Romanian female sprinters
Olympic athletes of Romania
Place of birth missing (living people)
World Athletics Indoor Championships medalists
Olympic female sprinters